Los Afincaos (English language:Sons of the Earth) is a 1941 Argentine melodramatic western film directed by Leónidas Barletta and written by Enzo Aloisi.

Overview
Los Afincaos (Sons of the Earth) was the first film ever produced by the major Argentine film company Teatro del Pueblo. Set in the Northern hills, the story concerns a pair of Indian brothers, leaders of their local tribe. The older of the brothers falls in love with a young school teacher, but rather than go through the courtship proceedings, he kidnaps and rapes the unfortunate girl. When she dies from grief, the younger brother avenges her death by killing his sibling. The acting and staging of Los Afincaos reveals a great deal about the lack of experience at such an early stage in Argentine feature film history.

Cast
José Álvarez   
Catalina Asta   
Remo Asta   
Juan Carlos Bettini   
Celia Eresky   
Juan Eresky   
Rosa Eresky   
Mari Galimberti   
Mario Genovesi   
Josefa Goldar   
Fernando Guerra   
Oscar Gutiérrez   
Roberto Leydet   
Emilio Lommi   
Mecha Martínez  
Olga Mosin   
Pascual Nacarati   
José Petriz   
Nélida Piuselli   
Marister Uslenghi   
José Veneziani

Release
The film premiered on 28 October 1941 in Buenos Aires.

References

External links 
 

1941 films
Argentine black-and-white films
1941 Western (genre) films
Argentine Western (genre) films
Melodrama films
1941 drama films
Argentine drama films
1940s Spanish-language films
1940s Argentine films